Patellapis kalutarae is a species of bee in the family Halictidae. It is endemic to Sri Lanka and was first found in Kalutara District.

External links
 Atlashymenoptera.net
 Discoverlife.org
 Academia.edu
 Atlashymenoptera.net

Halictidae
Hymenoptera of Asia
Insects of Sri Lanka